Glak (Armenian, from Middle Iranian *gilak or *gulak "little flower") may be:
Zenob Glak
Saint Karapet Monastery, a 4th-century monastery of Taron, is also known as Glak Monastery, after Zenob Glak
Glak (Cylaces), a 4th-century Armenian Grand Chamberlain (hayr mardpet)